John Sutcliffe (died 1987) was a British fashion designer and fetish photographer, famous in the 1950s, 1960s and 1970s as a designer of clothes for aficionados of leather, rubber and PVC fetishism, with an emphasis on rubber and leather catsuits, cloaks, and gasmasks.

After service in the RAF, he set up a workshop at 10a Dryden Street in London.

It is a popular misconception that he designed the leather outfits for The Avengers. He did not. They were designed by Michael Whittaker for Honor Blackman and by John Bates for Diana Rigg, although they may have been made in his workshop.  He did design some costumes for the stage version of The Avengers which appeared later.  He also designed the leather catsuit worn by Marianne Faithfull in the 1968 film The Girl on a Motorcycle which may have been influenced by the style of The Avengers.

At one time he designed a boot suit, which comprised a pair of thigh-length boots, which carried on to join at the crotch, and then upwards to become an entire catsuit with a hood.

He was also the publisher of the fetish magazine AtomAge, which featured many of his clothing designs.
It had two sister publications, The Rubberist and Dressing For Pleasure, both of which are now published by Dave Watson of G&M Fashions.

AtomAge attracted a certain amount of attention when the police decided to prosecute the publisher, Sutcliffe, in the mid-1980s, for obscenity. Despite protest from both fetishists and defenders of civil liberties alike, Sutcliffe pleaded guilty. His stock and photos were seized and destroyed and the publications temporarily closed. The shame may well have contributed to his death.

Sutcliffe's legacy is the booming fetish clothing industry in Britain, Germany, the US and many other parts of the world, the wide range of fetish events, such as the yearly Rubber Ball in the UK, and the large numbers of people who enjoy dressing up in exciting ways without fear of prosecution.

In his final years, Sutcliffe shared a workshop in West London with Cocoon, the foremost rubber and latex designers of the time.

2010 saw the publication of the first ever book about Sutcliffe and AtomAge - Dressing For Pleasure, a history of AtomAge is published by Fuel and edited by Jonny Trunk.

References

External links
 Dressing For Pleasure, the book of Atomage imagery, history and readers letters
 Atomage Magazine Appreciation Site (A private, non-commercial site featuring the history and work of John Sutcliffe and his Atomage fetish clothing business)
 EVOLVER article on John Sutcliffe (in German)

Year of birth missing
1987 deaths
British fashion designers
Fetish photographers
Sexual fetishism
Fetish clothing manufacturers
British erotic photographers
Photographers from London